Scythris popescugorji is a moth of the family Scythrididae. It was described by Passerin d’Entrèves in 1984. It is found in Portugal and Turkey, where it usually occurs in mountainous regions.

References

popescugorji
Moths described in 1984
Moths of Europe
Moths of Asia